Thryptomene parviflora is a species of flowering plant in the family Myrtaceae and is endemic to Queensland. It is a slender, erect shrub with decussate, linear to egg-shaped leaves with the narrower end towards the base, and flowers with five petals and five stamens arranged singly in leaf axils.

Description

Taxonomy
This thryptomene was first formally described in 1867 by George Bentham who gave it the name Thryptomene oligandra var. parviflora in Flora Australiensis from an unpublished description by Ferdinand von Mueller. The type specimens were collected by Mueller from near the Gilbert River. In 1928, Karel Domin raised the variety to species status as Thryptomene parviflora. The specific epithet (parviflora) means "small-leaved".

Distribution and habitat
This thryptomene grows in a variety of soils in woodland and forest in arid areas of inland south-eastern Queensland.

Conservation status
Thryptomene oligandra is classified as of "least concern" under the Queensland Government Nature Conservation Act 1992.

References

oligandra
Flora of Queensland
Taxa named by George Bentham
Plants described in 1867